Eucyclopera abdulla is a moth of the family Erebidae. It is found in Mexico.

References

 Natural History Museum Lepidoptera generic names catalog

Nudariina
Moths described in 1917